A convoy is a group of vehicles traveling together for mutual support.

Convoy may also refer to:

Places
 Convoy, County Donegal, a village in the Republic of Ireland
 Convoy, Ohio, a village in the United States

Film and television
 Convoy (1927 film), an American silent film starring Lowell Sherman
 Convoy (1940 film), a British film directed by Pen Tennyson
 Convoy (1978 film), a film by Sam Peckinpah and Kris Kristofferson, inspired by the C. W. McCall song of the same name
 Convoy (TV series), a 1965 television series starring John Gavin

Music
 Convoy (band), a southern Californian rock music band
 "Convoy" (song), a 1975 trucker's song by C. W. McCall

Other uses
 Convoy, a character from the Vigilante 8 video games
 LDV Convoy, a cargo/passenger van manufactured by LDV
 Lock convoy, a performance problem that can occur when using locks for concurrency control in a multithreaded application
 Convoy (company), a Seattle-based trucking startup
 Convoy (video game), an indie video game
 The Japanese name of the Transformers character Optimus Prime (コンボイ, Konboi)
 Convoy protests in Canada in 2022